Loic Philippe Oscar Serge Van Doren (born 14 September 1996) is a Belgian field hockey player who plays as a goalkeeper for Dragons and the Belgium national team.

He is the brother of fellow Belgian international Arthur Van Doren.

Club career
Van Doren came through the youth ranks of Dragons and played there for the senior team until 2018 when he transferred to Dutch club Den Bosch. After three seasons in Den Bosch he returned to Dragons for the 2021–22 season.

International career
Van Doren played for the Belgian under-21 national team at the 2016 Junior World Cup, where they won the silver medal. He made his debut for the senior national team in a test match in South Africa. He was the second goalkeeper of the Belgian team that won the 2018 World Cup. He played in one game in the 2019 EuroHockey Championship, where Belgium won their first European title. On 25 May 2021, he was selected in the squad for the 2021 EuroHockey Championship.

Honours

International
Belgium
World Cup: 2018
EuroHockey Championship: 2019
FIH Pro League: 2020–21

Club
Dragons
Belgian Hockey League: 2015–16, 2016–17, 2017–18

References

External links
 

1996 births
Living people
Sportspeople from Antwerp
Belgian male field hockey players
Male field hockey goalkeepers
2018 Men's Hockey World Cup players
KHC Dragons players
HC Den Bosch players
Men's Hoofdklasse Hockey players
Expatriate field hockey players
Belgian expatriate sportspeople in the Netherlands
Men's Belgian Hockey League players
2023 Men's FIH Hockey World Cup players